Quebrada de Cardones Natural Monument is a natural monument located in the Arica y Parinacota Region, Chile. It is traversed by Chile Route 11. About 73 plant species are found in this protected area, chief of which being the Browningia candelaris.

References

 

Natural monuments of Chile
Protected areas of Arica y Parinacota Region